Bernard Williams (25 August 1908 – 2004) was an Irish professional footballer active in France during the 1930s and 1940s.

Career
Born in Dublin, Williams played as a striker for Sochaux between 1932 and 1947, winning the French League title in 1935 and 1938, and the French Cup in 1937.

References

1908 births
2004 deaths
Republic of Ireland association footballers
Association footballers from Dublin (city)
Association football forwards
FC Sochaux-Montbéliard players
Ligue 1 players
Irish expatriate sportspeople in France
Expatriate footballers in France